Elizabeth Popper (born 30 August 1962) is a Venezuelan table tennis player. She competed in the women's singles event at the 1988 Summer Olympics.

References

External links
 

1962 births
Living people
Venezuelan female table tennis players
Olympic table tennis players of Venezuela
Table tennis players at the 1988 Summer Olympics
Place of birth missing (living people)
Pan American Games medalists in table tennis
Pan American Games silver medalists for Venezuela
Pan American Games bronze medalists for Venezuela
Medalists at the 1983 Pan American Games
Medalists at the 1987 Pan American Games
Medalists at the 1991 Pan American Games
Table tennis players at the 1983 Pan American Games
Table tennis players at the 1987 Pan American Games
Table tennis players at the 1991 Pan American Games
20th-century Venezuelan women
21st-century Venezuelan women